The 2016 United States Senate election in South Carolina was held on November 8, 2016, to elect a member of the United States Senate to represent the State of South Carolina, concurrently with the 2016 U.S. presidential election, as well as other elections to the United States Senate in other states and elections to the United States House of Representatives and various state and local elections. Both major parties held their primaries on June 14.

Incumbent Republican Senator Tim Scott won re-election to a first full term in office.

This was the second U.S. Senate election in South Carolina where both major party nominees were black, and the third overall since the passage of the Seventeenth Amendment.

Background 
Two-term Republican Senator Jim DeMint was re-elected with 61.48% of the vote in 2010. He resigned at the start of 2013 to become President of The Heritage Foundation and U.S. Representative Tim Scott of South Carolina's 1st congressional district was appointed to replace him by Governor Nimrata Randhawa. Scott subsequently won the special election in 2014 for the remaining two years of the term.

Republican primary

Candidates

Declared 
 Tim Scott, incumbent U.S. Senator

Democratic primary

Candidates

Declared 
 Thomas Dixon, pastor and community activist (also running with Green Party nomination)

Declined 
 Joyce Dickerson, Richland County Councilwoman and nominee for the U.S. Senate in 2014 (running for reelection)

General election

Candidates 
 Tim Scott (Republican), incumbent U.S. Senator
 Thomas Dixon (Democratic, Green), pastor and community activist
 Bill Bledsoe (Libertarian, Constitution)
 Michael Scarborough (American), attorney

Debates

Predictions

Polling

with Joyce Dickerson

with Bakari Sellers

with Leon Lott

with Jim Hodges

Results

References

Notes

External links 
 Tim Scott (R) for Senate
 Thomas Dixon (D) for Senate
 Bill Bledsoe (L/C) for Senate
 Mike Scarborough (A) for Senate

2016
South Carolina
United States Senate